Charity Mucucuti (born 9 November 1983) is a Zimbabwean women's basketball and rugby union player from Goromonzi, Zimbabwe. she has played for both the Zimbabwe women's national basketball team and the Zimbabwe women's national rugby union team.

Basketball 
Mucucuti started playing basketball for the Cameo basketball team, which won forty regional and national championships. She made her international debut for Zimbabwe in the qualifying round of the 2007 FIBA Africa Championship for Women. She also participated in the  Basketball at the 2007 All-Africa Games – Women's tournament. She continued to represent Zimbabwe internationally until 2015 where she started playing rugby union. In 2017, she returned to basketball to play for Zimbabwe in the AfroBasket Women 2017 qualification tournament.

Rugby union 
After moving on from basketball, Mucucuti started to play rugby union. She eventually became captain of the Zimbabwe women's national rugby sevens team. She started playing as a winger but later moved to prop due to losing pace.

References 

Living people
1983 births
Zimbabwean women's basketball players
Zimbabwean rugby union players
Women of African descent
People from Goromonzi District
Sportspeople from Mashonaland East Province
Competitors at the 2007 All-Africa Games
African Games competitors for Zimbabwe